1st The Queen's Dragoon Guards (QDG) is a regiment in the Royal Armoured Corps of the British Army. Nicknamed The Welsh Cavalry, the regiment recruits from Wales and the bordering English counties of Cheshire, Herefordshire, and Shropshire, and is the senior cavalry regiment, and therefore senior regiment of the line of the British Army.

History

The current regiment was formed in 1959 by the amalgamation of 1st King's Dragoon Guards (raised in 1685 by Sir John Lanier as Lanier's or the 2nd Queen's Regiment of Horse in response to the Monmouth Rebellion) and the 2nd Dragoon Guards (Queen's Bays) (raised in 1685 by the Earl of Peterborough as Peterborough's or the 3rd Regiment of Horse, also in response to the Monmouth Rebellion).

The regiment has spent much of its history based in Germany. It served during the Aden Emergency in 1966 and 1967 and its squadrons were dispersed throughout the Middle East during that time. Perhaps the best known member in the 1970s was Captain Mark Phillips, one-time husband of The Princess Anne: they married in 1973.

In 1983, the regiment was deployed to Lebanon in support of the allied Multinational Force, in 1990 it was sent to the Middle East for the Gulf War and in 1996 it was deployed to Bosnia as part of NATO peacekeeping forces during the Yugoslav Wars.

In 2003, the regiment served in Iraq during the invasion of Iraq providing the reconnaissance and light armour support necessary to allow 3 Commando Brigade's advance north to Basra. On their return from Iraq in 2005, Brigadier Rose of 3 Commando Brigade presented the Regiment with the Commando Dagger in recognition of the superb relationship between 'C' Squadron and the Royal Marines during the liberation of Iraq. It is of note that this squadron had the distinction of spending one of the longest periods of constant contact with the enemy for 20 days or so during this operation. In 2006, the QDG deployed again to Iraq on Op TELIC 8 and oversaw the successful transfer of Al Muthanna province back to Iraqi control.

At the end of 2007, the Regiment left Osnabrück and moved to Dempsey Barracks, Sennelager where they trained for a six-month deployment to Afghanistan as part of 3 Commando Brigade. Here they carried out a variety of frontline tasks across Helmand province. QDG were the first Formation Reconnaissance Regiment to deploy to Helmand as the Intelligence, Surveillance and Target Acquisition Group (ISTAR Gp) on Operation HERRICK 15 in 2011. The ISTAR Gp consisted of HQ Squadron, 'C' Squadron, 'D' Squadron QRH, an Intelligence Company, K Battery 5 Regt RA and 11 UAV Battery with 'B' Squadron initially detached to the Danish Battlegroup but joining the remainder of the Regiment towards the end of the tour.

The regiment celebrated its fiftieth anniversary on 31 July 2009 with a ceremony at Cardiff castle and a parade through the streets of Cardiff city, both attended by the Colonel-in-Chief, the Prince of Wales (now Charles III). The regiment received a great response from the people of Cardiff. That same year, the unit was also awarded with the Freedom of the City of Swansea.

In 2012, the regiment were called in to provide security for the 2012 London Olympics with composite squadrons focused on supporting the beach volleyball and securing the athletes village.  In May of that year, there was speculation that the unit would become a victim of the defence budget cuts. As it was one of only three regiments historically associated with and one that still largely recruits from Wales, there was much support from the Welsh public to keep the QDG. However, Ministry of Defence officials announced no such plan has been made.

As part of the Army 2020 plans, most units based in Germany returned to the UK and the QDG moved to Robertson Barracks, Swanton Morley, Norfolk in June 2015. They have re-roled as "light cavalry", using Jackal vehicles.

In 2014, the Regiment deployed on the final British combat deployment to Helmand Province on Operation HERRICK 20. Battlegroup Headquarters worked alongside the senior leadership of 3/215 Brigade of the Afghan Army. 'A' Squadron worked with the Afghan Army to develop the latter's capabilities and professionalism in a training capacity. 'B' Squadron formed the Afghan National Security Forces Liaison Team, patrolling to the forward operating bases across the southern part of the province. 'C' Squadron formed the Brigade Reconnaissance Force.

In 2018, the QDG conducted two tours of Poland on Operation Cabrit providing the role for NATO as the enhanced forward presence in order to protect and reassure NATO's Central and Northern European member states on NATO's eastern flank of their security.

As part of the Future Soldier programme, the regiment will remain in their light cavalry role but move to Caerwent 'not before' 2027.  In 2022 the regiment is due to be re-subordinated to an unknown formation and be re-structured by June 2024.

Operational role

The regiment operates in a light cavalry role and is now equipped with Jackal 2 armoured fighting vehicles.

Regimental museum
The regimental collection is displayed at Firing Line: Cardiff Castle Museum of the Welsh Soldier in Cardiff.

Uniform, cap badge and march

In 1896, Emperor Franz Joseph I of Austria was appointed Colonel-in-Chief of the 1st King's Dragoon Guards and allowed the regiment to wear the Austrian imperial coat of arms, which is still used as the regiment's cap badge today; the collar badge is that of The Queen's Bays. Also the regiment adopted an Austrian military march, Radetzky March, as quick march. The current Regimental March is the Radetzky March and Rusty Buckles, the latter being the Regimental March of The Queen's Bays. Other items of uniform draw on the regiment's dual heritage: thus, whilst the cap of 1st King's Dragoon Guards (with dark blue velvet strip and piping) is worn, trousers have the distinctive broad white stripe of The Queen's Bays.

Full dress is still worn by some on ceremonial occasions: the 1st King's Dragoon Guards tunic (scarlet with blue velvet facings) being paired with Queen's Bays white-striped overalls. The KDG red-plumed brass cavalry helmet is also worn, together with pouch belts and other accoutrements.

In the QDG lance corporals wear two chevrons, corporals wear two chevrons surmounted by a rank badge consisting of the Bay's emblem, which is worn by all senior NCOs.  Squadron quartermaster sergeants wear four chevrons with rank badge, the whole surmounted by a crown.

Battle honours
 Combined battle honours of 1st King's Dragoon Guards, and 2nd Dragoon Guards (Queen's Bays), plus:
 Wadi al-Batin, Gulf 1991

Commanding officers
The Commanding Officers have been:

1959–1960: Lt.-Col. H C Selby
1960–1962: Lt.-Col. Jack W. Harman
1962–1964: Lt.-Col. Peter R. Body
1964–1967: Lt.-Col. Thomas W. Muir
1967–1969: Lt.-Col. George N. Powell
1969–1971: Lt.-Col. John H. Lidsey
1971–1973: Lt.-Col. Maurice R. Johnston
1973–1975: Lt.-Col. Robin C. Middleton
1975–1977: Lt.-Col. Robert W. Ward
1977–1980: Lt.-Col. John I. Pocock
1980–1982: Lt.-Col. Charles H. Bond
1982–1985: Lt.-Col. J. Gordon G. de P. Ferguson
1985–1987: Lt.-Col. Eric J. K. O’Brien
1987–1990: Lt.-Col. Michael G. Boissard
1990–1992: Lt.-Col. Christopher Mackenzie-Beevor
1992–1994: Lt.-Col. Mark R. M. Eliot
1994–1997: Lt.-Col. Hamish L. A. Macdonald
1997–1999: Lt.-Col. Simon V. Mayall
1999–2001: Lt.-Col. Patrick J. Andrews
2001–2003: Lt.-Col. Gilbert T. Baldwin
2003–2005: Lt.-Col. Timothy R. Wilson
2005–2007: Lt.-Col. Anthony J. Pittman
2007–2010: Lt.-Col. Alan S. Richmond
2010–2012: Lt.-Col. Jasper J. De Quincey Adams
2012–2015: Lt.-Col. William H. L. Davies
2015–2017: Lt.-Col. Daniel B. Duff
2017–2019: Lt.-Col. Justin G. E. Stenhouse
2019–2022: Lt.-Col. Hugo T. Lloyd
2022–Present: Lt.-Col. Chris Kierstead

Colonels-in-chief
Colonels-in-chief were as follows:

1959: Queen Elizabeth, The Queen Mother
2003: Field Marshal Prince Charles, The Prince of Wales

Regimental colonels
Regimental colonels were as follows:
1959–1961: Brig. John Gerard Edward Tiarks
1961–1964: Col. George William Charles Draffen 
1964–1968: Col. Kenneth Edward Savill 
1968–1975: Brig. Anthony William Allen Llewellyn-Palmer 
1975–1980: Gen. Sir Jack Wentworth Harman  ADCGen
1980–1986: Maj. Gen. Desmond Hind Garrett Rice 
1986–1991: Lt Gen. Sir Maurice Robert Johnston 
1991–1997: Maj. Gen. Robert William Ward 
1997–2002: Col. John Ievers Pocock 
2002–2007: Col. Christopher David MacKenzie-Beevor 
2007–2019: Lt Gen. Sir Simon Mayall 
2019–present: Brig. Alan Richmond

Alliances

Royal Navy

HMS Monmouth

Affiliated Regiment

The Royal Mercian and Lancastrian Yeomanry

Allied Royal Air Force Squadron

IV Squadron RAF

Affiliation

The Worshipful Company of Leathersellers

Commonwealth
 – The Governor General's Horse Guards
 – 1st/15th Royal New South Wales Lancers
 – 1 Special Service Battalion
 – 11th Cavalry (Frontier Force)
 – 1st Reconnaissance Regiment

Non-Commonwealth
 – Panzergrenadierbataillon 35
 – 1er Régiment Étranger de Cavalerie(Twinned Regiment)

Order of precedence

References

External links
Official site
QDG Regimental Comrades Association
1st The Queen's Dragoon Guards – National Army Museum
British Army Locations from 1945

1-001 Queen's Dragoon Guards
Royal Armoured Corps
Dragoon Guards
Military units and formations in Wales
Military units and formations in Cardiff
Military units and formations established in 1959
1959 establishments in the United Kingdom